Kim Ju-gong (born 23 April 1996) is a South Korean football forward, who plays for Jeju United FC in the K League 1, South Korea's top-tier professional football league.

Club career
Born on 23 April 1996, Kim joined Gwangju FC in 2019. He made his debut for the club on 12 May 2019, playing as a substitute in a K League 2 match against Busan. He played his first match in the K League 1 on 17 May 2020, as a starter against FC Seoul.

In 2022, he moved to Jeju United FC.

Club career statistics

Honors and awards

Player
Gwangju FC
 League Winners (1) : 2019 K League 2

Notes

External links
Player profile on Gwangju FC website (in Korean)

1996 births
Living people
Association football forwards
South Korean footballers
Gwangju FC players
K League 1 players
K League 2 players